Mario Medina Rojas (born 2 September 1952) is a Mexican former football forward who played for Mexico in the 1978 FIFA World Cup. He also played for Deportivo Toluca.

References

External links
FIFA profile

1952 births
Mexican footballers
Mexico international footballers
Association football forwards
Deportivo Toluca F.C. players
1978 FIFA World Cup players
Liga MX players
Living people